The 2018 Conference USA men's basketball tournament was the postseason men's basketball tournament for Conference USA for the 2017–18 NCAA Division I men's basketball season. It was held from March 7–10, 2018, in Frisco, Texas, at the Ford Center at The Star. In the first round and quarterfinals, two games were played simultaneously within the same arena, with the courts separated by a curtain. 

The tournament was won by Marshall, who defeated Western Kentucky in the conference title game, earning the conference's automatic berth into the NCAA tournament, their first Conference USA Tournament title.

Seeds
Only 12 conference teams were eligible for the tournament. The top four teams receive a bye to the quarterfinals of the tournament. Teams were seeded by record within the conference, with a tiebreaker system to seed teams with identical conference records.

Schedule

Rankings denote tournament seed.

Bracket

* denotes overtime period.

References

See also
 2018 Conference USA women's basketball tournament

Tournament
Conference USA men's basketball tournament
College sports tournaments in Texas
Sports in Frisco, Texas
Conference USA men's basketball tournament
Conference USA men's basketball tournament
Basketball competitions in Texas